Johannes Soans (also Juhan Soans; 1867 Kuivajõe Parish, Harju County – 1941 Soviet Union) was an Estonian politician. He was a member of I Riigikogu. On 15 March 1922, he resigned his position and he was replaced by Sergei Andrejev.

References

1867 births
1941 deaths
Members of the Riigikogu, 1920–1923